In mathematics, strong convergence may refer to:

 The strong convergence of random variables of a probability distribution.
 The norm-convergence of a sequence in a Hilbert space (as opposed to weak convergence).
 The convergence of operators in the strong operator topology.